Meghna Gulzar is an Indian writer, director and producer. She is best known for directing of Bollywood film Raazi in 2018.  

After debuting as a screenwriter with her father's 1999 directorial Hu Tu Tu, Meghna directed her first film, the drama Filhaal... (2002), though did not achieve success in direction that decade. Following an eight-year sabbatical, she directed the critically acclaimed Talvar (2015), which earned her Best Director nominations despite underperforming at the box office. Her first directorial profitable venture came in 2018, when she directed the patriotic thriller Raazi, that emerged as one of the highest-grossing Indian films. She won the Filmfare Award for Best Director for her work in the same. This established her as a director, and she next helmed the biographical drama Chhapaak (2020).

Early life and education
The daughter of lyricist and poet Gulzar and former actress Raakhee, Meghna Gulzar was born on 13 December 1973 in Maharashtra, Mumbai. She was named Meghna by her mother, after the river Meghna in present day Bangladesh.

Career 

Meghna began her writing career as a freelance writer for The Times of India and the NFDC publication Cinema in India. Her poetry was published in anthologies of the Poetry Society of India. After completing her graduation in Sociology, she worked with noted filmmaker Saeed Akhtar Mirza as an assistant director. In 1995, she completed a short course in filmmaking from the Tisch School of Arts, New York University, New York. Upon her return, she joined her father, writer-director Gulzar, as an assistant on his films Maachis and Hu Tu Tu. Meghna simultaneously began scripting her own film along with directing documentaries for Doordarshan and music videos for several music albums.

Meghna directed her first film, Filhaal, in 2002, starring former Miss Universe-turned-actress Sushmita Sen and Tabu. Her second directorial movie was Just Married in 2007. She also directed a short film Pooranmasi for Sanjay Gupta's anthology Dus Kahaniyaan, starring Amrita Singh. In 2015, Meghna directed Talvar, written by Vishal Bharadwaj and based on the 2008 Noida double murder case.

In 2018, she directed the thriller Raazi. Produced by Junglee Pictures and Dharma Productions, it starred Alia Bhatt and Vicky Kaushal.
The film is based on Harinder Sikka’s novel Calling Sehmat. Both Talvar and Raazi received Filmfare Award for Best Film nominations and Meghna garnered two nominations in the Best Director category for her work. Raazi managed to win Best Film and Meghna won the Best Director award for it as well.

For her next directorial concept, Meghna chose to make a biopic on the life of acid attack survivor Laxmi Agarwal, which she named Chhapaak, that is about Malti, an acid attack survivor inspired by Agarwal. The film featured Deepika Padukone as Malti and was critically acclaimed upon its release on 10 January 2020. She will next helm the life of military officer Sam Manekshaw in a biographical film that will star Kaushal as Manekshaw and is produced by Ronnie Screwvala.

Filmography

References

External links 

 

Living people
1973 births
Indian women film directors
Place of birth missing (living people)
Filmfare Awards winners
Hindi-language film directors
Indian women screenwriters
Film directors from Mumbai
21st-century Indian film directors
Women artists from Maharashtra
21st-century Indian dramatists and playwrights
21st-century Indian women artists
Screenwriters from Mumbai
21st-century Indian women writers
21st-century Indian screenwriters